Egypt–Tanzania relations are bilateral relations between Egypt and Tanzania. The two nations primarily maintain trade ties and established formal diplomatic relations in 1964.

Overview 
Relations between Egypt and Tanzania official began in 1964 after Tanganyika formed a union with Zanzibar.

Trade 
Trade volume between the two countries was approximately $40m USD in 2020, with an imbalance favouring Egypt. Egyptian exports to Tanzania include food and chemical products, metals, small manufactured goods and paper products. As for the imports, they include wood, raw leather, tea and chemical products.

The Julius Nyerere Hydropower Station being built in Tanzania is a $2.9bn project that was awarded to Arab Contractors and El Sewedy Electric both Egyptian firms. The consortium won the bid competitively and is the largest valued project conducted by the two countries.

High Level Diplomatic Visits

Presidential 

 22 September 1966 - Gamal Abdel Nasser visited Tanzania and Zanzibar for a 5 day state visit to make the first state visit by Egypt to Tanzania.
 March 1968 - Julius Nyerere visited Cairo and met president Nasser on his visit official state visit to Egypt.
 July 1999, Benjamin Mkapa made a state visit to Egypt. Trade agreements and future transformation of the Tanzanian private sector were discussed.
 21 January 2003, Benjamin Mkapa made a second visit to Egypt to launch the Egyptian-Tanzanian summit.
 17 August 2017, Abdel Fattah el-Sisi, conducted a short state visit to Tanzania, the first Egyptian sitting president to make an official state visit after Nasser made the inaugural one in 1966. 
 10 November 2021, Samia Suluhu Hassan make an official 3-day state visit to Egypt to enhance bilateral ties.

Diplomatic missions 
Egypt maintains an embassy in Dar es Salaam and a consulate in Zanzibar. Additionally, Tanzania has an embassy in Cairo, which is also accredited to Lebanon, Palestine, Libya, Iraq, Syria and Jordan.

Ambassadors of Tanzania to Egypt include:

 Dr Salim Ahmed Salim (1964-1965)
 George Maige Nhigula (1968-1971)
 Ali Hassan Mwinyi (1977-1982)
 Mohammed Mwinyi Mzale (1993-2002)
 Kassim M. J. Mwawado (2003-2006)
 Haji Mohamed Hamza (2012-2017)
 Major Gen. (Ret) Issa S. Nassor (2017-2019)
 Major General Anselimu Bahati (2019-Present)

See also 

 African Free Trade Zone

References 

 
Tanzania
Egypt